Getting Married Today may refer to:
 Getting Married Today (Desperate Housewives)
 Getting Married Today (song)